Augsbuert-Lytswâld is a small village in the Dutch province of Friesland. It is in the municipality Noardeast-Fryslân, about 1 km southeast of the town of Kollum.

Augsbuurt had about 70 inhabitants in January 2017.

History 
It was first mentioned in the 15th century Aeltsbuur. The etymology is unclear, however Lytsewâld means "little forest". Augsbuert-Lytsewâld had a chapel as early as 1347. In 1782, the current church built. In 1975 it was restored, and was in use by a music school and brass band until 2010, and nowadays it can be rented for weddings, funerals and family gatherings.

In 1840, Augsbuert-Lytsewâld was home to 165 people.

Gallery

References

Populated places in Friesland
Noardeast-Fryslân